Nizhnyaya Petrovka is a rural locality (a settlement) in Rasskazikhinsky Selsoviet, Pervomaysky District, Altai Krai, Russia. The population was 188 as of 2013. There are 5 streets.

Geography 
Nizhnyaya Petrovka is located 67 km south of Novoaltaysk (the district's administrative centre) by road. Malaya Rechka is the nearest rural locality.

References 

Rural localities in Pervomaysky District, Altai Krai